Jovina Tseng (born 6 May 1950) is a Malaysian former swimmer. She competed in three events at the 1964 Summer Olympics.

References

1950 births
Living people
Malaysian female swimmers
Olympic swimmers of Malaysia
Swimmers at the 1964 Summer Olympics
Place of birth missing (living people)
Asian Games medalists in swimming
Asian Games silver medalists for Singapore
Asian Games bronze medalists for Singapore
Swimmers at the 1966 Asian Games
Swimmers at the 1970 Asian Games
Medalists at the 1966 Asian Games
Medalists at the 1970 Asian Games
Southeast Asian Games medalists in swimming
Southeast Asian Games silver medalists for Singapore
Southeast Asian Games bronze medalists for Singapore
Competitors at the 1965 Southeast Asian Peninsular Games